Alleppey Ranganath (9 March 1949 – 16 January 2022) was an Indian composer, lyricist, music and film director and screenwriter.

Biography
Ranganath, who was born in 1949 in Alappuzha, as the eldest son of Kunjukunju Bhagavathar and Devamma, both musicians, has composed many Malayalam songs in various fields. 

His best known songs are Swami Sangeetham Aalapikkum, En Manam Ponnambalam, Pathupathungi Pammi Nadakkum, etc. Most of his songs were sung by K. J. Yesudas.

Ranganath died of COVID-19 on 16 January 2022, at the age of 72. Just days before his death, he was awarded with Harivarasanam award by Travancore Devaswom Board, and he had a concert at Sabarimala Temple. He was cremated with full state honours at his home in Kottayam, where he was living for the last few years of his life. He is survived by his wife and four children.

References

External links
 

1949 births
2022 deaths
People from Alappuzha
20th-century Indian composers
21st-century Indian composers
Indian male film score composers
Indian male screenwriters
Screenwriters from Kerala
Malayalam film directors
Deaths from the COVID-19 pandemic in India